Dominican cuisine may refer to:

 Dominica cuisine, commonly eaten in the country Dominica
 Dominican Republic cuisine, commonly eaten in the Dominican Republic